Elatia is a former municipality on the island of Zakynthos, Ionian Islands, Greece. Since the 2011 local government reform it is part of the municipality Zakynthos, of which it is a municipal unit. It is located in the northwestern part of the island. With a land area of 111.412 km², it is the largest municipal unit on Zakynthos, comprising about 27 percent of its area. Its population was 1,933 at the 2011 census. The seat of the municipality was in the town of Volimes (pop. 406). The next largest towns are Maries (296), Áno Volímes (262), and Orthoniés (222).

External links
Official website

References

Populated places in Zakynthos
Acropolis Rally